MPA or mPa may refer to:

Academia

Academic degrees
 Master of Performing Arts
 Master of Professional Accountancy
 Master of Public Administration
 Master of Public Affairs

Schools
 Mesa Preparatory Academy
 Morgan Park Academy
 Mounds Park Academy
 Mount Pisgah Academy

Science and medicine
 Megapascal, SI unit of pressure
 Marine protected area
 MeerKAT Precursor Array for the MeerKAT radio telescope in South Africa
 Microscopic polyangiitis, a disease
 Minor physical anomalies
 Movement pattern analysis, for assessing motivations

Chemicals
 Medroxyprogesterone acetate
 3-Mercaptopropionic acid
 Methiopropamine, (N-methyl-1-(thiophen-2-yl)propan-2-amine)
 Methylphosphonic acid
 Mycophenolic acid, an immunosuppressant drug
 4-Nonanoylmorpholine or morpholide pelargonic acid

Legislation
 Marriage Protection Act, 2003–2004 US federal bill

Organizations and companies
 Macedonian Press Agency, Greece
 Maine Principals' Association, governing school sports, Maine, US
 Manipur People's Army, India
 Manufacturing Perfumers' Association, the original name of the Personal Care Products Council from 1894 to 1922
 Max Planck Institute for Astrophysics, near Munich, Germany
 Medical Products Agency (Sweden)
 Metropolitan Police Authority, London, UK (2000–2012)
 Mineral Products Association, UK
 Motion Picture Association, US
 Movement for the Autonomies, Sicily, Italy
 MPA – the Association of Magazine Media, US
 Music Publishers Association, US
 Music Publishers Association (UK)

Transportation
 Maritime patrol aircraft
 Maritime and Port Authority of Singapore
 Maryland and Pennsylvania Railroad, US
 Maryland Port Administration, US
 Mauritius Ports Authority
 Mount Pleasant Airport, Falkland Islands
 Myanma Port Authority, Myanmar

Other uses
 Mario Party Advance, a 2005 video game
 Member of the Provincial Assembly, Pakistan
 MPA submachine gun

See also
 
 
 MPAS (disambiguation)